Dame Stella Rimington  (born 13 May 1935) is a British author and former Director General of MI5, a position she held from 1992 to 1996. She was the first female DG of MI5, and the first DG whose name was publicised on appointment. In 1993, Rimington became the first DG of MI5 to pose openly for cameras at the launch of a brochure outlining the organisation's activities.

Early life
Rimington was born Stella Whitehouse in South London, England; her family moved from South Norwood to Essex in 1939, due to the danger of living in London during World War II. Her father got a job as chief draughtsman at a steel works in Barrow-in-Furness in Cumbria, and the family moved there. She described living through the Barrow Blitz as a small child, and becoming claustrophobic into adulthood, needing an exit route from any situation. She was educated at Croslands Convent School after spending some time in Wallasey. When her father got a job in Ilkeston, Derbyshire, the family moved to the Midlands, where Stella attended Nottingham High School for Girls. She spent her last summer of secondary school working as an au pair in Paris, before enrolling at the University of Edinburgh in 1954 to study English. By chance, she met her future husband, John Rimington, whom she had known from Nottingham.

Completing her degree in 1958, she studied archive administration at the University of Liverpool, before beginning work as an archivist at the County Record Office in Worcester in 1959. In 1963, she married John Rimington and moved to London, where she successfully applied for a position at the India Office Library.

In 1965, her husband was offered an overseas posting as First Secretary (Economic) for the British High Commission in New Delhi, India, and the couple sailed to India in September.

India and MI5
In 1967, after two years in India, Rimington was asked to assist one of the First Secretaries at the High Commission with his office work. She agreed, and when she began, discovered that he was the representative in India of the British Security Service (MI5). Gaining her security clearance, Rimington worked in the MI5 office for nearly two years, until she and her husband returned to London in 1969, where she decided to apply for a permanent position at MI5. 

Between 1969 and 1990, Rimington worked in all three branches of the Security Service: counter espionage, counter subversion, and counter terrorism.
Following the 1979 Department of Health and Social Security computer operators strike, Rimington became an assistant director of the revived Inter-departmental Group on Subversion in Public Life to identify and limit the actions of subversives in the civil service.

In 1989, she gave evidence in court against the Czechoslovak spy Václav Jelínek (prosecuted under his alias of "Erwin van Haarlem"), using the alias "Miss J". In 1990, she was promoted to one of the Service's two Deputy Director General positions, where she oversaw MI5's move to Thames House. In December 1991, she made a visit to Moscow to make the first friendly contact between the British intelligence services and their old enemies the KGB. On her return from Russia she was told she had been promoted to Director General.

Director General
In her first months as Director General, Rimington was subject to a determined campaign by the British press to identify her. The New Statesman and The Independent had obtained and published covert photographs of her, despite which Rimington oversaw a public relations campaign to improve the openness of the Service and increase public transparency. On 16 July 1993, MI5 (with the reluctant approval of the British Government) published a 36-page booklet titled The Security Service, which revealed publicly, for the first time, details of MI5's activities, operations and duties, as well as the identity and even photographs of Rimington as Director General.

Rimington retired from MI5 in 1996. She was made a Dame Commander of the Order of the Bath (DCB) in the 1996 New Year Honours.

Her role in the service was considered a model for Dame Judi Dench's portrayal of M  in the James Bond series starting in GoldenEye.

Post-MI5
Rimington's work after leaving MI5 has been as a non-executive director for companies such as Marks & Spencer and BG Group.

Rimington published her memoirs, entitled Open Secret, in 2001. In July 2004, her first novel, At Risk, about a female intelligence officer, Liz Carlyle, was published. A series of further novels followed.

In 2004, she continued her interest in archives, fostered by her early career, through involvement with the Archives Task Force, where she visited a number of archives through the country and contributed to the report for the future strategy of archives in the UK.

In November 2005 she spoke out against national ID cards. She has also described the US response to the 9/11 attacks as a "huge overreaction." In remarks reported in 2009, Rimington expressed concerns that the Brown administration was not "recognizing that there are risks, rather than frightening people in order to be able to pass laws which restrict civil liberties, precisely one of the objects of terrorism: that we live in fear and under a police state."

On 5 October 2009 the BBC broadcast a statement from Rimington who claimed that certain MI5 files collected by her predecessors had been destroyed, but without clarifying whether this took place during her appointment as Director General, or as part of her later involvement with the Archives Task Force.

In 2009, Rimington received an Honorary Degree of Doctor of Social Science from Nottingham Trent University in recognition of her support for openness about the work of the secret service.

She was chair of the judges for the 2011 Man Booker Prize. She and her fellow judges were widely criticised for focusing on "readability" rather than literary quality. Rimington responded during her speech at the Booker ceremony with a "diatribe" in which she compared British literary critics to the KGB.

Personal life
In 1963 she married John Rimington, whom she knew from school. In 1984 they separated, with Stella retaining custody of their two daughters. They did not divorce because it "seemed a faff", and in later life reconciled, living together during the covid lockdown of 2021. Rimington commented "It's a good recipe for marriage, I'd say: split up, live separately, and return to it later".

Bibliography

At Risk
Rimington's first novel, At Risk, brings her knowledge of spy operations to the thriller genre. Her heroine is 34-year-old an MI5 intelligence officer, Liz Carlyle, hunting down a terrorist cell.

At Risk has received positive reviews with The Telegraph saying, "At Risk is breezily told, seldom pompous, and the plot, though every bit as hokey as you'd expect, winds its threads together very entertainingly." The acknowledgements section indicates that it was written with the help of Luke Jennings: "Huge thanks are also due to Luke Jennings whose help with the research and the writing made it all happen." Some attributed the improvement in writing quality from her earlier autobiography to Jennings' involvement.

Autobiography

Liz Carlyle Novels

Manon Tyler Novels

See also
Rimington

References

External links
 ABC.Net.au, Stella Rimington talks about her life and writing spy fiction.
BBC.co.uk, 1993: Secret Service goes public.
TrashOtron.com, Stella Rimington Interview at The Agony Column Podcast with Rick Kleffel on 25 July 2008
stellarimington.uk, official website

1935 births
Living people
Alumni of the University of Edinburgh
Alumni of the University of Liverpool
Dames Commander of the Order of the Bath
Directors General of MI5
English spy fiction writers
People educated at Nottingham Girls' High School
People from Barrow-in-Furness
English archivists
English autobiographers
20th-century English novelists
20th-century British women writers
21st-century English novelists
21st-century British women writers
Women autobiographers